Peg o' My Heart is a 1922 American silent drama film directed by King Vidor and starring Laurette Taylor. It is based on the 1912 play written by Taylor's husband J. Hartley Manners. The play starred Laurette Taylor and famously ran a record number of performances on Broadway.
Six reels of the original eight reels survive at the Library of Congress.

Proposed Paramount film
In 1919 Famous Players-Lasky filmed a version of the play and it starred newcomer Wanda Hawley. However, because of legal issues with Laurette Taylor and her husband J. Hartley Manners—ultimately decided in the United States Supreme Court case Manners v. Morosco—the film was never released.

Plot
As described in a film publication, Margaret "Peg" O'Connell (Taylor), according to her uncle's will, is to be educated in England under the supervision of her aunt, Mrs. Chichester (Lewis). Upon her arrival from Ireland, she is looked down upon by the Chichester household for her lack of culture, and she vows never to become a lady. She meets Jerry, a young man from a neighboring estate, who becomes her friend. Then she discovers that he is Sir Gerald Adair (Hamilton) and rebels at the deception he has been conducting. She also finds out that the only reason her aunt is keeping her is because of compensation from the will. Peg leaves to return home, but finds that she is in love with Gerald. Gerald follows her and proposes.

Cast
 Laurette Taylor as Margaret O'Connell
 Mahlon Hamilton as Sir Gerald Adair
 Russell Simpson as Jim O'Connell
 Ethel Grey Terry as Ethel Chichester
 Nigel Barrie as Charistian Brent
 Lionel Belmore as Hawks
 Vera Lewis as Mrs. Chichester
 Fred Huntley as Jarvis, the butler (as Fred Huntly)

Production
After his short-lived “Vidor Village” studio closed, King Vidor abandoned independent film-making and sought work with the dominant film studios.

Producer Louis B. Mayer, soon to form Metro-Goldwyn-Mayer offered him the task of adapting the stage production Peg o’ My Heart stage version to film. This would be the first of three plays Vidor would make for Mayer.

The enormously popular Broadway actress Laurette Taylor who portrayed the “impish” Peg O’Connell, an 18-year-old Irish orphan girl, was cast to star in the film production and—at the age of thirty-eight (born 1884)—presented certain technical challenges.

The relatively insensitive film stock of the early 1920s required ample lighting to record images, and tended to reveal the chronological age of an actor.. Given these limitations, Vidor improvised with modified lens and succeeded in creating a sufficiently youthful screen appearance for Taylor. Vidor was not, however, able to suppress the stage mannerisms that Taylor had internalized during her lengthy Broadway career.

Taylor was delighted with Vidor's handling of the picture and frequently screened Peg o' My Heart at social gatherings, prompting guest actress  Ethel Barrymore to warn Taylor that she would cease to attend her parties if she had to “sit through Peg o' My Heart again”.

Theme
As written by Manners, Peg o' My Heart contrasts the snobbishness of the British upper-middle class (Peg’s aunt Chichester) with the good-willed and sweetly sentimental character of the Irish lass, Peg -  a commonplace theatrical conceit.

Vidor invests the film with a moral facet derived from his populism that champions agrarian self-reliance and political independence. In the film version, Peg’s father emerges as an agitator for agrarian land reform, rather than a disaffected manual laborer as in the stage production. Peg’s superiority to her aristocratic relatives is altered by Vidor, and now originates in her class orientation that holds rural populism as a virtue. As such, Vidor was able to invest an element of his social commitments into an “extremely restricted” cinematic project.

Preservation status
Copies of the film exist at Cinematheque Royale de Belgique Brussels, Museum of Modern Art New York, Cinematheque Quebecoise, Montreal and Filmoteca Espanola, Madrid.

Footnotes

References
 Baxter, John. 1976. King Vidor. Simon & Schuster, Inc. Monarch Film Studies. LOC Card Number 75-23544.
 Durgnat, Raymond and Simmon, Scott. 1988. King Vidor, American. University of California Press, Berkeley.

External links

 
 
 
 
 Peg o' My Heart at Virtual History

1922 films
1922 drama films
Silent American drama films
American silent feature films
American black-and-white films
Films directed by King Vidor
Films with screenplays by J. Hartley Manners
Metro Pictures films
1920s American films